Kızılırmak is a town in Çankırı Province in the Central Anatolia region of Turkey. It takes its name from the river Kızılırmak. It is the seat of Kızılırmak District. Its population is 2,604 (2021).

References

External links
 Municipality's official website 

Populated places in Çankırı Province
Kızılırmak District
Towns in Turkey